Facing the Thousand is the third album by American melodic death metal band Light This City.

Track listing

Personnel
Facing the Thousand album personnel as listed on Allmusic.

Light This City
Laura Nichol - vocals
Brian Forbes - guitar
Steve Hoffman - guitar
Mike Dias - bass
Ben Murray - drums

Additional musicians
Trevor Strnad - Vocals on "Fear of Heights" (Frontman of The Black Dahlia Murder)
Alfred Lord Tennyson - Composer

Artwork and design
Mario Garza - Design, layout design
Jeremy Saffer - Photography

Production and recording
Zack Ohren -assistant engineering, mastering, mixing, production

References

2006 albums
Light This City albums
Prosthetic Records albums